Aleochara is a genus in the beetle family Staphylinidae, the Rove beetles; larvae of Staphylinidae occur in many assorted ecological roles, most being scavengers, predators or carrion feeders, but the larvae of at least those species of Aleochara whose life histories are known, are parasitoids; they feed in the puparia of suitable species of flies, killing the host in the process. Adult Aleochara are predators.

Aleochara are found worldwide except in Antarctica. There are at least 150 and possibly more than 400 species in 16 subgenera. The adults of many species can be found near dung or carrion, commonly feeding on the eggs, larvae, and puparia of various scatophagous and necrophagous Diptera.

The most extensively studied aleocharine rove beetle is Aleochara bilineata Gyllenhal, which is a significant biological control agent against some fly pests (notably Delia spp. in the family Anthomyiidae) of agricultural crops in the mustard and cabbage family Brassicaceae, such as cabbage, rutabaga, canola, and many others.

Among the species of this genus, Aleochara bilineata is very well studied, and Aleochara wrightii was named after Jane Wright, the entomologist who discovered it

Subgenera
The genus Aleochara contains at least 150 and possibly more than 400 species, distributed into 16 subgenera. Below is a list of subgenera:

Heterochara 
Aleochara 
Aidochara
Euryodma 
Ceranota 
Emplenota 
Triochara 
Maseochara
Echochara
Calochara 
Mesochara 
Xenochara
Rheochara
Polystomota 
Coprochara
Megalogastria

See also
 List of Aleochara species

References

Other sources
Klimaszewski, J. 1984. A revision of the genus Aleochara Gravenhorst in America north of Mexico (Coleoptera: Staphylinidae, Aleocharinae). Memoirs of the Entomological Society of Canada 129: 1–211.
Maus, C., B. Mittman, K. Peschke. 1998. Host records of parasitoid Aleochara Gravenhorst species (Coleoptera: Staphylinidae) attacking puparia of cyclorrhapheous Diptera. Deutsche Entomologische Zeitschrift 45: 231–254.

Aleocharinae genera
Beetles of Europe
Beetles of North America
Taxa named by Johann Ludwig Christian Gravenhorst